David Douglas Harper (May 5, 1966- October 20, 2021), nicknamed "Harpdog", was a former American football linebacker in the National Football League (NFL) for the Dallas Cowboys. He also was a member of the Sacramento Gold Miners, San Antonio Texans and Ottawa Rough Riders in the Canadian Football League (CFL). He played college football at Humboldt State University.

Early years
Harper attended Eureka High School where he played as a running back. He moved on to the College of the Redwoods, where he was named to the All-Golden Valley Conference team in 1986.

He accepted a football scholarship from Weber State University, but decided to transfer the same year to Division II Humboldt State University, sitting out the 1987 season because of transferring rules.

As a junior, he played both running back and linebacker. Against the University of California-Davis, he had a season-high 114 rushing yards, including a 44-yard run. Against Azusa Pacific University, he registered 20 tackles and one interception. He also averaged 23.5 yards on 4 kickoff returns.

As a senior, he was moved full-time to inside linebacker. He posted 125 tackles (school record), 7 tackles for loss (led the team) and 5 sacks (third on the team). He became the first player ever from the school to participate in the East–West Shrine Game.

In 1997, he was inducted into the Humboldt State Athletics Hall of Fame.

Professional career

Dallas Cowboys
Harper was selected by the Dallas Cowboys in the 11th round (277th overall) of the 1990 NFL Draft. He was waived on August 26. He was signed to the practice squad on October 1, he was released and signed again on 30. He was promoted to the active roster on November 14. He was released before the start of the 1991 season.

Saskatchewan Roughriders (CFL)
In July 1992, he signed as a free agent with the Saskatchewan Roughriders of the Canadian Football League. He was limited with a pinched nerve during training camp and was released before the start of the season.

Sacramento Gold Miners / San Antonio Texans (CFL)
On May 4, 1994, he was signed as a free agent by the Sacramento Gold Miners of the Canadian Football League, finishing with 6 defensive tackles and 8 special teams tackles in 10 games. In 1995, the franchise moved to San Antonio and was re-named as the Texans. He recorded 74 tackles (5 for loss) and 7 sacks, while being named to the Southern All-Sar team. The franchise folded in February 1996.

Ottawa Rough Riders (CFL)
On August 2, 1996, he signed as a free agent with the Ottawa Rough Riders of the Canadian Football League. He only appeared in 2 games. The franchise folded in November 1996.

Montreal Alouettes (CFL)
In 1997, he was selected in the fifth round of the dispersal draft by the Montreal Alouettes. He was released before the start of the season.

Personal life
After his professional career, he was the athletic director, head football coach and a physical education teacher at Templeton High School. He is also known as Harpdog to his students and co-workers at Templeton High School.

Dave died on October 20, 2021 from COVID-19

References

1966 births
Living people
American football linebackers
Dallas Cowboys players
Humboldt State Lumberjacks football players
Ottawa Rough Riders players
Sacramento Gold Miners players
San Antonio Texans players
High school football coaches in California
Sportspeople from Eureka, California
Players of American football from California